Onuma, Ōnuma or Oonuma may refer to:

Onuma (surname), Japanese surname
Ōnuma District, Fukushima, district in Fukushima Prefecture, Japan
Ōnuma Station, train station in Hokkaido Prefecture, Japan
Ōnuma Quasi-National Park, national park in Hokkaido Prefecture, Japan, with a famous pond also called Ōnuma

People with the given name
Onuma Sittirak (born 1986), Thai volleyball player